Thyagaraja Leelaikal is a Tamil religious treatise on the playful nature of the deity Thyagaraja of Thiruvarur. It is similar to the Thiruvilaiyadal Puranam in that it identifies Thyagaraja with the Cholas in the same way that the former identifies Meenakshi with the Pandyas. It is dated to the twelfth century CE.

Content
The following are some excerpts from the work:

Leelai 1: The first act begins with Shiva asking Vishwakarma to build a town at Thiruvarur with a Valmika temple at its centre.

Leelai 3: This act begins with Shiva appearing as Thyagaraja and asking Airavata to garland the future king of Chola nadu as the land is without a king. Airavata garlands a sage who is of the Suryavamsa or Solar race.

Leelai 53: In this act Thyagaraja dons the robe of a king and dispenses justice to a family that is falsely denied of its wealth.

Leelai 70: This chapter explains how the children of Chola king Vikrama are saved by Thyagaraja when Sakuna Pandya tries to kill them using magic.

Leelai 102: In this act, Thyagaraja helps the Chola general against the Pandyas.

Leelai 248: In this chapter, we are told that when the Chola king was wounded in combat, blood poured out of the shoulder of Thyagaraja.

Leelai 322: In this act, celestial women play the Veena everyday to Thyagaraja and they are blessed to be born as mortals  and wed Chola kings.

Leelai 364: This chapter explains the grace of Thyagaraja to Āticholan.

References

Shaiva texts
Shaivism
Tamil-language literature
Bhakti movement